Maha Punjabi is a Punjabi music & movies channel launched on 1st of march, 2019. It is Free-to-air channel launched by Teleone Consumers Products which is part of DV Group.

Programming 
Bhotu Da Vehra
Dhansu Beats
Swag Punjab Da
Vardaat
Daawat By Chef

References

Television stations in India
Music television channels in India